Miarotagmata is a genus of moths belonging to the family Tineidae. It contains only one species, Miarotagmata penetrata, which is found in South Africa and Zimbabwe.

This species has a wingspan of 11 mm.

References

Myrmecozelinae
Monotypic moth genera
Moths of Africa
Insects of Zimbabwe